Phyllium gantungense is a species of insect in the family Phylliidae. It is endemic to the Philippines.

Taxonomy 
Phyllium gantungense was described in 2009 on the basis of a female holotype from Mount Gantung, Palawan. The holotype is currently stored in the Museum of Natural History, Genoa.

References 

Insects described in 2009
Insects of the Philippines
Phylliidae